Al-Muttalib ibn Abd al-Manaf (al-Muṭṭalib ibn Abd al-Manāf) was the grandfather of Ubaydah ibn al-Harith, a sahabi of Muhammad. He was also the ancestor of Imam Shafi.

History
His father was Abd Manaf ibn Qusai.

Al-Muttalib was the younger brother of Hashim ibn Abd Manaf (the great-grandfather of Muhammad). He succeeded his brother Hashim and took care of his nephew Shaiba ibn Hashim; when he returned to Mecca with his nephew people thought he was his new slave, so Shaiba became known as "Abd al-Muttalib" (servant of al-Muttalib) because slavery was so common and rampant at that time. When al-Muttalib died, his sons and nephew Abd al-Muttalib succeeded him.

He is the progenitor of Banu al-Muttalib through his children: Al-Harith (or Al-Arrat; father of Ubaydah, al-Tufayl, and al-Husayn), Ayyilah (who married Uhayb, brother of Wahb ibn Abd Manaf), Hashim (ancestor of Imam Shafi), Makhramah (father of Qays, al-Qasim, and as-Salt), 'Alqamah, Abu Ruhm and Abbad (only these children are known). His grandchildren and great-grandchildren became companions of their close relative, the prophet Muhammad, and narrated some of his sayings. Qays ibn Makhramah ibn al-Muttalib in particular is known for having been the master of Yasar, the grandfather of Muhammad Ibn Ishaq, before freeing Yasar with the surname "al-Muttalibi". (See Ibn Ishaq)

Family tree

Further reading 

 Geraldine de Gaury, Rulers of Mecca

See also
Banu Hashim

References

External links
Banu Hashim - Before the Birth of Islam

5th-century Arabs
510s deaths
Year of birth unknown
Quraysh